Maulvi Abdul Haq (20 April 1870 – 16 August 1961) was a scholar and a linguist, who some call Baba-e-Urdu (Father of Urdu). Abdul Haq was a champion of the Urdu language and the demanded for it to be made the national language of Pakistan.

Early life
He was deeply influenced by Syed's political and social views, and, following his wishes, learned English and scientific subjects. Like Syed Ahmad Khan, Haq saw Urdu as a major cultural and political influence on the life and identity of the Muslims of India.

In the same year, he was appointed secretary of the All India Muhammadan Educational Conference, which had been founded by Syed Ahmed Khan in 1886 for the promotion of education and intellectualism in Muslim society. Sir Syed founded the Anjuman Taraqqi-i-Urdu in 1903 in Aligarh with Thomas Walker Arnold as its first president and Shibli Nomani as the first secretary. In 1912 Haq was appointed as the secretary of the Anjuman. Under him the organisation flourished and published a number of magazines notably Urdu launched in January 1921, Science, in 1928, and Hamari zaban, in 1939. During this period he also served as the Principal of Osmania College (Aurangabad) and retired from that position in 1930.

Educational and political activities

Haq was a scholarly critic who provided criticisms of modern Urdu works and encouraged his students to develop literary skills and appreciation of Urdu. Following his retirement from Osmania University in 1930, Haq worked to compile and edit a comprehensive and authoritative English-Urdu dictionary.

In Pakistan
In 1948, Haq migrated to Pakistan. In the wake of migration and the accompanying riots in 1947, much of his property, especially valuable manuscripts, papers and books were lost. However, some of the material which he brought to Pakistan is kept in the Urdu Dictionary Board library.

The ordeals of partition and the migration also adversely affected Abdul Haq's health. He re-organised the Anjuman Taraqqi-e-Urdu in Karachi, launching journals, establishing libraries and schools, publishing a large number of books and promoting education in the Urdu language and linguistic research in it. Abdul Haq's work especially helped preserve the distinct "Old Urdu" linguistic and literary traditions of Hyderabad, known as Hyderabadi Urdu. He also used his organisation for political activism, promoting the adoption of Urdu as the lingua franca and sole official language of Pakistan.

Death
Despite illnesses and failing health, Haq continued to promote the active use of Urdu as a medium for all educational activities. He pushed for the creation of an Urdu College in Karachi, the adoption of Urdu as a medium of instruction for all subjects in educational institutions and worked to organise a national Urdu conference in 1959. Suffering from cancer, Haq died after a prolonged period of incapacitation on 16 August 1961 in Karachi.

==Baba-e-Urdu'''s publications==
For his achievements in the development and promotion of Urdu literature, he is officially regarded as Baba-e-Urdu. His best known works include the English-Urdu dictionary, Chand Ham Asar, Maktoobat, Muqaddimat, Tauqeedat, Qawaid-e-Urdu and Debacha Dastan Rani Ketki''. The Anjuman Taraqqi-e-Urdu remains an important intellectual organisation in Pakistan. Held in high esteem amongst the intellectuals, educationalists and scholars in Pakistan, Haq is praised for his work in promoting Muslim heritage and Urdu as a unifying medium for Pakistani Muslims.

Commemorative postage stamp issued in 2004

In recognition of his services to Urdu literature, Pakistan Post issued a Commemorative stamp in his honor on 16 August 2004 in its 'Men of Letters' series.

See also 
 Baba-e-Urdu
 Jamiluddin Aali
 Sahar Ansari
 Josh Malihabadi
 Anjuman-i Taraqqi-i Urdu

References

External links
 

1870 births
1961 deaths
People from Hapur
Muhajir people
Urdu-language writers
Pakistani scholars
Writers from Karachi
Literary critics of Urdu
Aligarh Muslim University alumni
Pakistani lexicographers
Scholars from Uttar Pradesh
Leaders of the Pakistan Movement
Writers from Hyderabad, India
Poets from Karachi
Federal Urdu University